NickMusic (formerly known as Nick Hits) is a music video channel for children in the Netherlands and Belgium. The channel launched as Nick Hits on 2 August 2007 and became NickMusic on 1 February 2017. It plays mainly child-friendly pop music. As of 1 July 2020, it was also made available in Australia and New Zealand without any localisation or timeshifting, and replaced MTV Music 24 throughout Central Europe on 1 June 2021. The channel has a Czech license (RRTV) in order to ensure the continuation of legal broadcasting in the EU in accordance with the EU Audiovisual Media Services Directive (AVMSD) and the Single Market Law after the UK leaves the European Union. Since the Czech Republic has minimum broadcasting rules, it was chosen for licensing purposes in the EU.

See also
NickMusic (Australia and New Zealand)

References

Television channels in the Netherlands
Television channels in Flanders
Television channels in Belgium
Nickelodeon
Children's television networks
Music organisations based in the Netherlands
Television channels and stations established in 2007